The Men's 94 kg weightlifting event at the 2006 Commonwealth Games took place at the Melbourne Exhibition Centre on 21 March 2006.

Schedule
All times are Australian Eastern Standard Time (UTC+10)

Records
Prior to this competition, the existing world, Commonwealth and Games records were as follows:

Results

References

Weightlifting at the 2006 Commonwealth Games